Aloysius C. Joy   (June 11, 1860 – June 28, 1937) was a Major League Baseball first baseman who played  for the Washington Nationals of the Union Association in 1884.

External links

1860 births
1937 deaths
Major League Baseball first basemen
19th-century baseball players
Washington Nationals (UA) players
Baseball players from Washington, D.C.